Gino Conforti (born January 30, 1932) is an American film, television and theatre actor. He is perhaps best known for his recurring role as kitchen helper/chef Felipe Gomez in the American television sitcom Three's Company.

Life and career 
Conforti was born in Chicago, of Italian descent. In 1962 Conforti appeared in the Broadway play A Family Affair. His other theatre credits include She Loves Me and Never Live Over a Pretzel Factory. In 1963, Conforti played the Fiddler in the Broadway play Fiddler on the Roof, leaving to join the cast of Poor Bitos, His final theatre credit was in the Broadway play Man of La Mancha, playing the starring role of the Barber. He began appearing on screen in 1968, when he appeared in the film How Sweet It Is!

Conforti guest-starred in numerous television programs including Get Smart, The Mary Tyler Moore Show, The Mod Squad, The Waltons, Mama's Family, The Flying Nun, Happy Days, Quincy, M.E., The Partridge Family, Columbo, Here's Lucy, The Hardy Boys/Nancy Drew Mysteries, The Fall Guy, The Jeffersons, Simon & Simon, Family Matters, Night Court and It Takes a Thief. He appeared in soap operas such as, Mary Hartman, Mary Hartman, General Hospital, Santa Barbara and Days of Our Lives, and in five episodes of the television sitcom That Girl. He also played the role of Felipe Gomez in Three's Company. In 1986, Conforti appeared in a commercial as a real estate agent. He also used a French accent for providing the voice of Jacquimo the swallow in the Don Bluth film Thumbelina.

References

External links 

Rotten Tomatoes profile

1932 births
Living people
People from Chicago
Male actors from Chicago
American male film actors
American male television actors
American male stage actors
American male soap opera actors
20th-century American male actors
21st-century American male actors
American people of Italian descent